Richard Fleischner is a Providence, RI–based environmental artist. Born in New York in 1944, he received a BFA and MFA from the Rhode Island School of Design, and began working in the 1960s.

Installations

Awards

Pell Award for Excellence in the Arts
The Louis Comfort Tiffany Foundation Award
National Endowment for the Arts Fellowships (1974, 1980, 1990)

External links
Biography from Knoedler Gallery
Review in New York Times
La Jolla Project, 1984
Untitled 1997
Space into Place
Interview with Richard Fleischner on All Ears
Stuart Collection at UCSD: Richard Fleischner
Columbia Subway Plaza, 1986

References

1944 births
Environmental artists
Living people
Artists from New York (state)
Rhode Island School of Design alumni